|}

The Blenheim Stakes is a Listed flat horse race in Ireland open to thoroughbreds aged two years only. It is run at Fairyhouse over a distance of 6 furlongs (1,206 metres), and it is scheduled to take place each year in September.

The race was first run in 1994 and was run at the Curragh until 2014.

Records
Leading jockey since 1994 (5 wins):
 Michael Kinane – Super Goldluck (1998), Black Minnaloushe (2000), Hurricane Alan (2002), Colossus (2003), Song Of My Heart (2009)

Leading trainer since 1994 (9 wins):
 Aidan O'Brien Rainbow Blues (1995), Check The Band (1996), Karakorum (1997), Black Minnaloushe (2000), Colossus (2003), Ad Valorem (2004), Art Museum (2005), Brave Tin Soldier (2006), The Great War (2014)

Winners

See also
 Horse racing in Ireland
 List of Irish flat horse races

References
Racing Post:

Flat races in Ireland
Fairyhouse Racecourse
Flat horse races for two-year-olds
Recurring sporting events established in 1995
1995 establishments in Ireland